Fidel Sánchez Hernández (7 July 1917 – 28 February 2003) was a Salvadoran military officer and politician who served as president of El Salvador from 1967 to 1972. During his rule, Sánchez Hernández faced war and economic turmoil.

Military career 
Before becoming president, Sánchez Hernández was an army general in El Salvador and had brief stints as a military attaché in Washington D.C. (after his participation in the overthrow of José María Lemus in 1960) and in Paris. President Julio Adalberto Rivera promoted him to Minister of the Interior in 1962, and he served in that office until 1967, when he succeeded Rivera to the position of president.

Presidency 
He continued Rivera's progressive programs and created a mostly civilian cabinet. The 1967 election was considered one of the few in the period of military domination to have been fairly conducted; the gains made by the opposition (winning a majority of the popular vote) in the legislative and local elections the following year suggested El Salvador was on the road to democratization, a trend that would not be continued as elections in the 1970s were blatantly rigged.

In July 1969, Sánchez Hernández led the Salvadoran Army in its brief but violent Football War against Honduras. He had much success, occupying a large part of that country. But, under a cease-fire agreement arranged by the Organization of American States, Sánchez Hernández agreed to pull his troops out, much to the opposition of many of his military leaders.

The war with Honduras led to much economic distress in El Salvador. Refugees, mostly Salvadorans that resided in Honduras, poured into the country and Honduras closed off trade routes.

Sánchez Hernández remained president until 1972 and was succeeded by Colonel Arturo Armando Molina.

Death 
On the night of 28 February 2003, Sánchez Hernández, aged 85, died of a heart attack while being taken to a military hospital in El Salvador.

Orders and decorations 

The following is a list of orders and decorations awarded to Sánchez Hernández:

  Order of Merit of Duarte, Sánchez and Mella (13 November 1970)

  Order of the Quetzal (3 September 1968)

  Collar of the Order of the Aztec Eagle (16 January 1958)

  Grand Cross of the Order of Isabella the Catholic

  Grand Order of Mugunghwa (22 September 1970)
  Grand National Order (4 March 1969)

  Grand Cordon of the Order of the Cloud and Banner (14 February 1968)

  Grand Cross of the Order of Merit of the Federal Republic of Germany (11 August 1971)

References

1917 births
2003 deaths
People from Morazán Department
Salvadoran people of Spanish descent
National Coalition Party (El Salvador) politicians
Presidents of El Salvador
Interior ministers of El Salvador
Salvadoran military personnel
Knights Grand Cross of the Order of Isabella the Catholic